Hellboy Christmas Special is a Dark Horse Comics one-shot comic book horror anthology edited by Scott Allie and featuring the work of Mike Mignola, Gary Gianni and Steve Purcell.

Creation
Mignola has stated that when he and Gary Gianni came up with the idea for this Christmas special and that for his own entry for it he took a story based on an old folktale that he had long mooted and added a Christmas angel to it.

Publication history
Hellboy Christmas Special (December 3, 1997) featured a cover by Gary Gianni.

Awards
The special won two 1998 Eisner Awards;
Best Writer/Artist: Drama for Mike Mignola.
Best Anthology, edited by Scott Allie.

References

1997 comics debuts
Fantasy comics
Eisner Award winners for Best Anthology
Dark Horse Comics one-shots